The 1943–44 New York Rangers season was the franchise's 18th season. During the regular season, the Rangers had a 6–39–5 record and compiled 17 points, the fewest of any team in franchise history. New York finished in last place in the NHL.

Regular season

Final standings

Record vs. opponents

Schedule and results

|- align="center" bgcolor="#FFBBBB"
| 1 || 30 || @ Toronto Maple Leafs || 5–2 || 0–1–0
|- align="center" bgcolor="#FFBBBB"
| 2 || 31 || @ Detroit Red Wings || 8–3 || 0–2–0
|-

|- align="center" bgcolor="#FFBBBB"
| 3 || 2 || @ Montreal Canadiens || 2–1 || 0–3–0
|- align="center" bgcolor="#FFBBBB"
| 4 || 6 || Chicago Black Hawks || 4–3 || 0–4–0
|- align="center" bgcolor="#FFBBBB"
| 5 || 7 || Toronto Maple Leafs || 7–4 || 0–5–0
|- align="center" bgcolor="#FFBBBB"
| 6 || 13 || Boston Bruins || 6–2 || 0–6–0
|- align="center" bgcolor="#FFBBBB"
| 7 || 14 || @ Chicago Black Hawks || 10–5 || 0–7–0
|- align="center" bgcolor="#FFBBBB"
| 8 || 18 || Detroit Red Wings || 3–1 || 0–8–0
|- align="center" bgcolor="#FFBBBB"
| 9 || 21 || Toronto Maple Leafs || 5–2 || 0–9–0
|- align="center" bgcolor="#FFBBBB"
| 10 || 25 || @ Boston Bruins || 6–2 || 0–10–0
|- align="center" bgcolor="#FFBBBB"
| 11 || 27 || @ Montreal Canadiens || 6–3 || 0–11–0
|- align="center" bgcolor="white"
| 12 || 28 || Montreal Canadiens || 2–2 || 0–11–1
|-

|- align="center" bgcolor="#FFBBBB"
| 13 || 4 || @ Toronto Maple Leafs || 11–4 || 0–12–1
|- align="center" bgcolor="#FFBBBB"
| 14 || 5 || @ Chicago Black Hawks || 7–6 || 0–13–1
|- align="center" bgcolor="#FFBBBB"
| 15 || 11 || @ Boston Bruins || 9–6 || 0–14–1
|- align="center" bgcolor="#CCFFCC"
| 16 || 12 || Boston Bruins || 6–4 || 1–14–1
|- align="center" bgcolor="#CCFFCC"
| 17 || 19 || Detroit Red Wings || 6–2 || 2–14–1
|- align="center" bgcolor="#FFBBBB"
| 18 || 23 || @ Detroit Red Wings || 5–3 || 2–15–1
|- align="center" bgcolor="#CCFFCC"
| 19 || 25 || @ Toronto Maple Leafs || 5–3 || 3–15–1
|- align="center" bgcolor="#CCFFCC"
| 20 || 26 || Chicago Black Hawks || 7–6 || 4–15–1
|- align="center" bgcolor="#FFBBBB"
| 21 || 31 || Toronto Maple Leafs || 4–0 || 4–16–1
|-

|- align="center" bgcolor="#FFBBBB"
| 22 || 2 || Boston Bruins || 13–3 || 4–17–1
|- align="center" bgcolor="#FFBBBB"
| 23 || 6 || Detroit Red Wings || 5–0 || 4–18–1
|- align="center" bgcolor="#FFBBBB"
| 24 || 8 || @ Montreal Canadiens || 8–2 || 4–19–1
|- align="center" bgcolor="#FFBBBB"
| 25 || 9 || Montreal Canadiens || 6–5 || 4–20–1
|- align="center" bgcolor="#FFBBBB"
| 26 || 13 || Chicago Black Hawks || 5–2 || 4–21–1
|- align="center" bgcolor="#FFBBBB"
| 27 || 15 || @ Boston Bruins || 7–5 || 4–22–1
|- align="center" bgcolor="#CCFFCC"
| 28 || 16 || Boston Bruins || 8–6 || 5–22–1
|- align="center" bgcolor="#CCFFCC"
| 29 || 22 || @ Toronto Maple Leafs || 5–1 || 6–22–1
|- align="center" bgcolor="#FFBBBB"
| 30 || 23 || @ Detroit Red Wings || 15–0 || 6–23–1
|- align="center" bgcolor="#FFBBBB"
| 31 || 27 || @ Chicago Black Hawks || 6–4 || 6–24–1
|- align="center" bgcolor="#FFBBBB"
| 32 || 30 || Montreal Canadiens || 5–3 || 6–25–1
|-

|- align="center" bgcolor="#FFBBBB"
| 33 || 3 || @ Detroit Red Wings || 12–2 || 6–26–1
|- align="center" bgcolor="#FFBBBB"
| 34 || 5 || @ Boston Bruins || 7–2 || 6–27–1
|- align="center" bgcolor="white"
| 35 || 6 || Chicago Black Hawks || 4–4 || 6–27–2
|- align="center" bgcolor="#FFBBBB"
| 36 || 10 || Detroit Red Wings || 8–3 || 6–28–2
|- align="center" bgcolor="#FFBBBB"
| 37 || 13 || Toronto Maple Leafs || 6–3 || 6–29–2
|- align="center" bgcolor="#FFBBBB"
| 38 || 19 || @ Montreal Canadiens || 5–2 || 6–30–2
|- align="center" bgcolor="#FFBBBB"
| 39 || 20 || Montreal Canadiens || 7–2 || 6–31–2
|- align="center" bgcolor="#FFBBBB"
| 40 || 22 || Chicago Black Hawks || 8–4 || 6–32–2
|- align="center" bgcolor="white"
| 41 || 24 || Detroit Red Wings || 3–3 || 6–32–3
|- align="center" bgcolor="#FFBBBB"
| 42 || 27 || @ Chicago Black Hawks || 4–2 || 6–33–3
|-

|- align="center" bgcolor="#FFBBBB"
| 43 || 2 || @ Detroit Red Wings || 6–5 || 6–34–3
|- align="center" bgcolor="#FFBBBB"
| 44 || 4 || @ Boston Bruins || 10–9 || 6–35–3
|- align="center" bgcolor="white"
| 45 || 5 || Boston Bruins || 4–4 || 6–35–4
|- align="center" bgcolor="#FFBBBB"
| 46 || 9 || Toronto Maple Leafs || 8–0 || 6–36–4
|- align="center" bgcolor="#FFBBBB"
| 47 || 11 || @ Toronto Maple Leafs || 5–0 || 6–37–4
|- align="center" bgcolor="white"
| 48 || 12 || @ Chicago Black Hawks || 4–4 || 6–37–5
|- align="center" bgcolor="#FFBBBB"
| 49 || 18 || @ Montreal Canadiens || 11–2 || 6–38–5
|- align="center" bgcolor="#FFBBBB"
| 50 || 19 || Montreal Canadiens || 6–1 || 6–39–5
|-

Playoffs
The Rangers finished the season in last place in the NHL for the second consecutive season and missed the 1944 Stanley Cup playoffs.

Player statistics
Skaters

Goaltenders

†Denotes player spent time with another team before joining Rangers. Stats reflect time with Rangers only.
‡Traded mid-season. Stats reflect time with Rangers only.

Source:

Awards and records
Longest losing streak to start the season (11 games)
Longest winless streak to start the season (15 games: 14 losses, 1 tie)

Transactions

References

New York Rangers seasons
New York Rangers
New York Rangers
New York Rangers
New York Rangers
Madison Square Garden
1940s in Manhattan